Lucius Postumius may refer to:
Lucius Postumius Albinus (consul 234 and 229 BC)
Lucius Postumius Albinus (consul 173 BC)
Lucius Postumius Albinus (consul 154 BC)
Lucius Postumius Megellus (consul 305 BC)
Lucius Postumius Megellus (consul 262 BC)